The United Progressive Alliance (UPA) (IAST: Saṃyukt Pragatishīl Gaṭhabandhan)  is a centre-left political alliance in India led by the Indian National Congress (INC). It was formed after the 2004 general election with support from left-leaning political parties when no single party got the majority. The UPA subsequently governed India from 2004 until 2014 before losing power to their main rivals, the Bharatiya Janata Party (BJP)-led National Democratic Alliance (NDA). The UPA currently rules six states of India.

History

2004–2008 
UPA was formed soon after the 2004 Lok Sabha election when no party had won a majority. The then ruling Bharatiya Janata Party-led National Democratic Alliance (NDA) won 181 seats of 544, as opposed to the UPA's tally of 218 seats.

The Left Front with 59 MPs (excluding the speaker of the Lok Sabha), the Samajwadi Party with 39 MPs and the Bahujan Samaj Party with 19 MPs were other significant blocks that supported UPA at various times. UPA did not achieve a majority, rather it relied on external support, similar to the formula adopted by the previous minority governments of the United Front, the NDA, the Congress government of P. V. Narasimha Rao, and earlier governments of V. P. Singh and Chandra Shekhar.

An informal alliance had existed prior to the elections as several of the constituent parties had developed seat-sharing agreements in many states. After the election the results of negotiations between parties were announced. The UPA government's policies were initially guided by a common minimum programme that the alliance hammered out with consultations with Jyoti Basu and Harkishan Singh Surjeet of the 59-member Left Front. Hence, government policies were generally perceived as centre-left, reflecting the centrist policies of the INC.

During the tenure of Jharkhand Chief Minister Madhu Koda, the constituents of the UPA were, by mutual consent, supporting his government.

On 22 July 2008, the UPA survived a vote of confidence in the parliament brought on by the Left Front withdrawing their support in protest at the India–United States Civil Nuclear Agreement. The Congress party and its leaders along with then Samajwadi Party leader Amar Singh were accused of a "cash for vote" scam as part of the cash-for-votes scandal, in which they were accused of buying votes in Lok Sabha to save the government. During UPA I, the economy saw steady economic growth and many people (100 million+) escaped poverty.

2009–2014 
In the 2009 Lok Sabha election, the UPA won 262 seats, of which the INC accounted for 206. During UPA II, the alliance was broiled in scams. This ranged from the 2G spectrum case to the Coalgate scam. These scams impacted UPA's image nationwide and the approval rating for the govt fell. In addition, many members left for YSRCP. This started a domino effect with members leaving to form their own parties and parties such as DMK leaving the alliance altogether. During this time UPA struggled with state election and leadership stability.  The alliance suffered a defeat in 2014 Lok Sabha election as it won only 60 seats. In addition, UPA won only one state election and got wiped out from Andhra Pradesh where they previously had 150+ MLA.

2015–2019 
From 2014 to 2017, UPA won only 3 state elections. This was blamed on the alliance's failed leadership and weakness compared to the NDA. In addition the party lost power in states where they had once won state elections as in Bihar. In 2017 the alliance lost again. In 2018 UPA had a phenomenal comeback in the state elections as the party won important in Karnataka, Rajasthan and others. More parties joined the alliance and it was stronger than ever.

In 2019 Lok Sabha election the UPA won only 91 seats in the general election and INC won 52 seats, thus failed to secure 10% seats required for the leader of opposition post. The alliance lost another state to BJP with the party winning by-polls and pushing the UPA into the minority.

Towards the end of 2019, the alliance made huge gains in Haryana, won in Jharkhand and formed a state-level alliance called Maha Vikas Aghadi to form the government in Maharashtra with Uddhav Thackeray of Shiv Sena leading the ministry. Shiv Sena had been a member of NDA for twenty five years. It left NDA and joined MVA in 2019.

2020–present 
Since 2020, more parties joined the alliance. The alliance lost the Bihar election that everyone expected it to win but in 2022, ruling party JD(U) left National Democratic Alliance and rejoined Mahagathbandhan to form government in Bihar.

In addition UPA only won 1 out of the 5 state elections in 2021. However the alliance made significant gain in a number of MLA races. MVA lost control of Maharashtra due to crisis and split in Shiv Sena. However, UPA won the state election in Himachal Pradesh.

Membership

Governments

List of chief ministers from UPA

List of deputy chief ministers from UPA

List of UPA state governments

Strength in legislative assemblies

Past members

Poll performances

List of presidents and vice presidents
Note that it refers to nomination by alliance, as the offices of President and Vice President are apolitical.

Presidents

Vice presidents

List of prime ministers

Timeline of the UPA and other regional alliances formed by the Congress Party

2014 

 UPA had its worst performance to date in the 2014 general election and ended up losing the power.
 The JKNC left the alliance due to INC deciding to contest in all the seats by itself.
 The Socialist Janata (Democratic) had left the alliance after it had merged with Janata Dal (United).
 UPA lost state election in Telangana, Odisha, Sikkim, Jammu and Kashmir, Jharkhand, Andhra Pradesh, Maharashtra, Haryana.
 UPA managed to win 1 state election and that was in Arunachal Pradesh.

2015 

 UPA lost elections in Delhi.
 MGB won elections in Bihar.

2016 

 UPA won state elections in Puducherry.
 UPA lost state elections in Tamil Nadu, West Bengal, Assam, Kerala.

2017 

 Janata Dal (United) quit the MGB alliance and joined NDA giving Bihar power from UPA to NDA.
 UPA won in state election of Punjab.
 UPA lost in state election of Uttar Pradesh, Manipur, Himachal Pradesh, Uttarakhand and Gujarat.
 In addition UPA lost the presidential election to NDA's Ram Nath Kovind.
MDMK (state party in TN) left NDA and joined UPA.
VCK (State party in TN) joined UPA in 2014.

2018 

 In 2018 Janata Dal (Secular) formed alliance with Congress to help form government in Karnataka.
 UPA lost election in state election of Telangana, Meghalaya, Mizoram, Nagaland, Tripura.
 UPA won in the state elections of Rajasthan, Madhya Pradesh, Chhattisgarh, Karnataka.
RJD rejoined UPA.
UPA created a sub-alliance called "Maha Kutami" with TDP, TJS, CPI for the Telangana election however the alliance lost and was ended after the election.
Telangana Jana Samithi (party in Telangana) joined UPA.

2019 

 UPA lost in the 2019 Indian general election to NDA.
 UPA lost state elections in Andhra Pradesh, Arunachal Pradesh, Odisha, Sikkim, Haryana.
 UPA won in state election in Jharkhand
 MVA alliance formed after 2019 Maharashtra Legislative Assembly election results. MVA formed government in Maharashtra.
 In 2019 Congress - JD(S) alliance lost power in Karnataka due to crisis and the by-polls gave majority to NDA and pushed UPA to minority.
 Janata Dal (Secular) left the alliance after the fall of Karnataka govt.
AIUDF joined UPA after UPA invited as it was against the implementation of CAA-NRC, and JKNC rejoined UPA back at national level after a break-up in 2014.

2020 

 UPA lost state election in Delhi, Bihar.
 The KC(M) was expelled by INC from the alliance due to the factions forming in the party.
 In 2020 UPA lost power in Madhya Pradesh due to crisis and the by-polls gave majority to NDA and pushed UPA to minority.

2021 

 3 MLA resigned from UPA in Puducherry causing the government to go from majority to minority, and during the no trust confidence UPA fail to prove majority causing the government to fall.
 BPF (left NDA) and joined the alliance ahead of the 2021 Assam election.
 UPA lost state election in Assam, Kerala, Puducherry and West Bengal.
 SPA won state election in Tamil Nadu.
 Goa Forward Party joined UPA.
 UPA cut all ties with Indian Secular Front after defeat in West Bengal elections and the Sanjukta Morcha alliance was disbanded.
 Bodoland People's Front  left the alliance due to poor performance in the 2021 Assam election.
AIUDF was expelled from UPA.
RJD left the alliance due to seat sharing disagreements for 2024 Lok Sabha Elections.

2022 
 Assam Jatiya Parishad joined UPA.
 UPA lost election in Punjab, Uttarakhand, Uttar Pradesh, Goa, Manipur. 
 MVA Government falls in Maharashtra due to crisis and split in Shiv Sena.
 JDU rejoined MGB. MGB formed government in Bihar.
 UPA lost state election in Gujarat.
 UPA won state election in Himachal Pradesh.

2023

 UPA lost state elections in Meghalaya, Nagaland and Tripura.

Candidates in elections

Lok Sabha general elections
 2009 Indian general election
 2014 Indian general election
 2019 Indian general election
 2024 Indian general election

Controversies
The winter session of parliament in October 2008 came under intense criticism from the Left parties and the BJP to demand a full-fledged winter session instead of what was seen as the UPA to having "scuttled the voice of Parliament" by bringing down the sittings to a record low of 30 days in the year. The tensions between the UPA and the opposition parties became evident at an all-party meeting convened by Lok Sabha speaker Somnath Chatterjee when the leader of opposition, LK Advani questioned the status, timing and schedule of the current session of parliament.

M. Karunanidhi had said he felt "let down" by the "lukewarm" response of the Centre and had demanded amendments in the resolution on Sri Lanka.

One of the amendments was to "declare that genocide and war crimes had been committed and inflicted on the Eelam Tamils by the Sri Lankan Army and the administrators".

The second one was "establishment of a credible and independent international commission of investigation in a time-bound manner into the allegations of war crimes, crimes against humanity, violations of international human rights law, violations of international humanitarian law and crime of genocide against the Tamils". Karunanidhi said Parliament should adopt the resolution incorporating these two amendments.

The UPA was criticised for its alleged involvement scams such as the Commonwealth Games Scam of 2010, the 2G spectrum case, and the Coalgate scam. Apart from the above-mentioned scams, the UPA has been under intense fire for the alleged doles handed out to the son-in-law of the Gandhi family, Robert Vadra, by UPA-run state governments.

See also
 Indian National Congress
 Coalition government
 National Advisory Council
 National Democratic Alliance
 Third Front (India)

References

External links
Common Minimum Programme of the UPA.
Arora, Balveer and Tawa Lama Rewal, Stéphanie. "Introduction: Contextualizing and Interpreting the 15th Lok Sabha Elections". South Asia Multidisciplinary Academic Journal, 3, 2009

 
2004 establishments in India
Manmohan Singh administration
Political parties established in 2004